In geometric mechanics a  presymplectic form is a closed differential 2-form of constant rank on a manifold. However, some authors use different definitions. Recently, Hajduk and Walczak defined a presymplectic form as a closed differential 2-form of maximal rank on a manifold of odd dimension. A symplectic form is a presymplectic form that is also nondegenerate. Lack of nondegeneracy, leading to presymplectic forms, occurs in dynamical systems with singular Lagrangians, Hamiltonian systems with constraints and control theory.

References

Dynamical systems
Differential geometry